Nepenthes alzapan is a tropical pitcher plant native to the Philippine island of Luzon. It is known from only a handful of herbarium specimens collected in 1925 from submontane mossy forest at an elevation of 1800 m above sea level. It is closely allied to N. bellii and has similarly diminutive pitchers.

The specific epithet alzapan refers to Mount Alzapan in the Sierra Madre mountains, from which the type material was collected.

References

 Mey, F.S. 2013. Nepenthes alzapan and an army of new species from the Philippines. Strange Fruits: A Garden's Chronicle, July 15, 2013.
 Smith, L. 2014. Pitcher perfect - but carnivorous plants are at risk. The Independent, January 5, 2014. 

Carnivorous plants of Asia
alzapan
Endemic flora of the Philippines
Flora of Luzon
Plants described in 2013
Taxa named by Martin Cheek
Taxa named by Matthew Jebb